Kung Fu Powerhouse, (also titled One by One ), is a 1973 Hong Kong action martial arts film directed by Lung Chien,  and starring Yasuaki Kurata.

Plot 

Kuo Fu, a ruthless drug trafficker, escapes forced labor. The problem for him is that another prisoner insists on following him even after he escapes. Kuo suspects that his unwanted friend is a cop under an assumed name.

Cast

 Kang Chin
 Yasuaki Kurata
 Blackie Shou-Liang Ko
 Ka Ting Lee
 Leung Siu-lung

References

External links

1970 films
1970 martial arts films
1970s action films
1970s martial arts films
1970s Cantonese-language films
Films shot in Hong Kong
Hong Kong action films
Hong Kong films about revenge
Hong Kong martial arts films
Kung fu films
1970s Mandarin-language films
Films directed by Lung Chien
1970s Hong Kong films